The War Memorial Building is a historic building in Jackson, Mississippi, U.S.. It was designed by architect Edgar Lucian Malvaney, and built in 1939–1940. It has been listed on the National Register of Historic Places as a contributing property in the Capitol Green since November 25, 1969.

Sculptor Albert Rieker designed two friezes on the building.

References

National Register of Historic Places in Jackson, Mississippi
Buildings and structures completed in 1940